Teleshkronja Post is an independent news and media website (news portal) based in Kosovo. Founded on 26 November 2017, the newsportal is known for its range of news, news delivery, fast and accuracy of information. The online daily news web portal Teleshkronja Post is a medium of free sponsors. The business model is supported up by marketing services and independent editorial promotion in Albanian content. Teleshkronja Post can be easily found on social networks as well like Facebook, Instagram,Twitter and YouTube .

See also
List of newspapers in Kosovo

References

External links
Teleshkronja Post online
Teleshkronja Post Impressum
Teleshkronja Post about page
Article in Gazeta NewBorn

Mass media in Pristina
Kosovan news websites